No Tomorrow (Swedish: Ingen morgondag) is a 1957 Swedish drama film directed by Arne Mattsson and starring Jarl Kulle, Margit Carlqvist and  Kolbjörn Knudsen. It was shot at the Centrumateljéerna Studios in Stockholm and on location in Helsinki and Porkkalanniemi on the Gulf of Finland. The film's sets were designed by the art director Bibi Lindström. It was adapted by Finnish writer Mika Waltari from his own novel of the same title.

Synopsis
During the Continuation War Finnish Captain Viktor Aaltonen it taken prisoner in Karelia and sent to a Soviet prisoner of war camp for many years.

Cast
 Jarl Kulle as Viktor Aaltonen
 Margit Carlqvist as 	Astrid Bergas
 Kolbjörn Knudsen as 	Bergas
 Lars Ekborg as 	Raul
 Allan Edwall as 	Poet
 Carl-Olof Alm as 	Artist
 Olof Widgren as 	Doctor Linnmo
 Gunnar Olsson as Toivo Hietari
 Jan Olov Andersson as Pojke som pekar ut mordplats
 Eric Fröling as 	Socialhjälpstjänsteman
 Åke Lindman as 	Förrymd fånge
 Tapio Rautavaara as 	Man singing and playing guitar
 Anneli Sauli as 	Konstnärens modell
 Henake Schubak as Bergas betjänt
 Axel Slangus as 	Blind tiggare
 Brita Öberg as 	Mrs. Hietari

References

Bibliography 
  Cowie, Peter Françoise Buquet, Risto Pitkänen & Godfried Talboom. Scandinavian Cinema: A Survey of the Films and Film-makers of Denmark, Finland, Iceland, Norway, and Sweden. Tantivy Press, 1992.
 Qvist, Per Olov & von Bagh, Peter. Guide to the Cinema of Sweden and Finland. Greenwood Publishing Group, 2000.

External links 
 

1957 films
Swedish drama films
1957 drama films
1950s Swedish-language films
Films directed by Arne Mattsson
Films based on Finnish novels
Films set in Finland
Films shot in Finland
Eastern Front of World War II films
1950s Swedish films